House of Others is a 2016 Georgian drama film directed by Rusudan Glurjidze.
It was selected as the Georgian entry for the Best Foreign Language Film at the 89th Academy Awards but it was not nominated.

Cast
 Zurab Magalashvili
 Olga Dihovichnaya
 Ia Sukhitashvili
 Salome Demuria

Awards

See also
 List of submissions to the 89th Academy Awards for Best Foreign Language Film
 List of Georgian submissions for the Academy Award for Best Foreign Language Film

References

External links
 Film's facebook page
  
 

2016 films
2016 drama films
Drama films from Georgia (country)
2010s Georgian-language films
2016 directorial debut films